Scarlett Carlos Clarke (born 1992) is a British photographer and artist based in London.

Early life 

Carlos Clarke was born in London on January 9, 1992, the daughter of British-Irish photographer Bob Carlos Clarke.

Career
Her debut solo exhibition The Smell of Calpol on a Warm Summer's Night, was at Cob Gallery in July 2021. Combining photography, sculpture and video, the exhibition was said by Hannah Abel-Hirsch in The British Journal of Photography to "engender a visceral feeling tied to the experience of domesticity. That simultaneous sense of comfort and claustrophobia, which can intensify after becoming a parent." Molly Cranston wrote in The Editorial Magazine that "The images themselves are lush and painterly, Clarke handles dramatic chiaroscuro like a renaissance painter, imbuing her photos with a sense of history and cinema, but the buzz-blue tones and household props (Daz detergent, Irn-Bru, Pampers) plant her subjects resolutely in contemporary Britain." Nick Waplington has compared them to the works of painters Edward Hopper and Grant Wood.

She is the youngest photographer to have a photograph acquired by the National Portrait Gallery, London.

Group exhibitions 
2015: Take! Eat!, Diane Chire and Mc Llamas, St Marylebone Parish Church, London
2016: New Femininity # 1, curated by GIRLS, Blender Studio, Berlin
2017: A Story the World Needs to See, Berlin Feminist Film Week, Berlin
2018: New Femininity # 2, Curated by GIRLS, Mutuo Galeria, Barcelona
2018: Pillow talk, Curated by Antonia Marsh, Palm Tree Gallery, London
2019: New Femininity # 3, Melkweg Expo, Amsterdam

Collections
National Portrait Gallery, London: 1 print (as of 14 February 2022)

References

External links

21st-century British photographers
British women photographers
Photographers from London
Living people
1992 births